Piotr Mosór (born 28 March 1974) is a retired Polish football defender. He later became a manager.

Personal life
His son, Ariel Mosór, is a professional football player.

References

1974 births
Living people
Polish footballers
GKS Katowice players
Ruch Chorzów players
Legia Warsaw players
Lechia Gdańsk players
Widzew Łódź players
Pogoń Szczecin players
Amica Wronki players
Wisła Płock players
Świt Nowy Dwór Mazowiecki players
Association football defenders
Poland under-21 international footballers
Polish football managers
Świt Nowy Dwór Mazowiecki managers
Legionovia Legionowo managers
Znicz Pruszków managers